= Teknofonic Recordings =

Electronica focused independent record label based in New York, USA

Teknofonic Recordings is an electronica focused independent record label and artist services company headquartered in New York, NY.

== History ==
Founded in 2015 by American composer and producer Adam Salty, Teknofonic Recordings is a New York-based record label and artist services company focusing on artists producing electronic dance music. Created for independent artists to directly reach audiences through online retailers such as iTunes and, Spotify. The label also provides master rights management, public relation services, and music distribution supervision.

The label released its first compilation album, “Teknofonic Essentials Vol. 1” in April 2015 and features tracks with styles ranging from dubstep and house to trance and ambient. Artists include Sonic Fear, Daniel Monroe, Upper Regions, Jon Lambousis, 3logit, This Human Condition, Scott Cameron, Acid Daze, J Tizzle, Cypha Da Moonchild, Time No More, Elastic Plastic Generation, Hypnotriq, Ermias, Boom, M!nts, Derrick Anthony, Perry Engineering, S.G.B, and Addliss.
